Ilkeston Rutland Cricket Club is an amateur cricket club based in Ilkeston, Derbyshire, England. The club has a history dating back to 1824.

Ground
Ilkeston Rutland's main ground is the Rutland Sports Park, on Oakwell Drive in Ilkeston which includes a two lane, all-weather net facility. Their second ground is at The Stute on Hallam Field Road. The 1st and 2nd XI teams use the Rutland Sports Park pitch, rated by the DCCL as a Grade A+ ground, and the 3rd and 4th XI use the pitch on The Stute, rated as a Grade B ground. Their main ground (Rutland Sports Park) has a proud history of annually hosting 1st Class recreation matches between 1925 – 1994. In 1977, the ground hosted Derbyshire's Gillette Cup quarter-final tie against a Somerset side which included Ian Botham, Viv Richards and Joel Garner, when on an extremely hot day, 11,000 spectators packed into the ground.

History
Ilkeston Rutland Cricket Club was formed in 1829, and led a peripatetic existence for its first 100 years. The earliest known record of a cricket ground for Ilkeston was a field near to Lawn Cottage, Pimlico, donated by the Duke of Rutland. A few years later a ground to the south of St. Mary's churchyard was made available, known as the Old Cricket Ground. By 1876, the club relocated to a new ground on land also loaned by the Duke of Rutland on the understanding that the local authority would develop it into a recreation ground. However, the ground quality at this stage was so poor that turf had to be lifted and transported from the Old Cricket Ground. Ilkeston Rutland Cricket Club was one of the founder members of the Derbyshire League in 1890. The club then joined the Ilkeston & District League, and won in 1909. In 1914 George V visited Ilkeston and the land was finally passed to the authority and the ground extended. The cricket ground was prepared to county match standards and officially opened as the Rutland Recreation Ground on Wednesday 6 May 1925. Ilkeston Rutland Cricket Club tendered to use the ground and started to use it the following year. Derbyshire played the first match there later that summer, and continued to do so until 1994. After a break during the Second World War, the club was revived in 1947. By 1978 the club started off the club's junior section. In 1982, the club amalgamated with the Ilkeston Casuals, winning the O J Jackson Cup the same year, and in 2017, the club amalgamated with the Stanton Elks, originally called the Stanton & Awsworth Elks Cricket Club.

The Club currently has 4 senior teams competing in the Derbyshire County Cricket League, a women's softball team in the East Midlands Women's Cricket League
 and a long established and very successful junior training section that play competitive cricket in the Erewash Young Cricketers League.

Club performance
The Derbyshire County Cricket League competition results showing the club's positions in the league (by Division) since 2002.

Club honours

Ircc on film
 Featuring Ilkeston Rutland CC ground and facilities
 Ilkeston Rutland CC 'tp365' Cricket Practice Facility
 History of Derbyshire County Cricket Club featuring Rutland Sports Park

See also
Club cricket

References

Further reading
 Blasdale, Frank. 1979 "Story of Ilkeston Rutland Cricket Club", Moorley's Print & Publishing (978-0-8607-1075-2)

External links
 The Club Play-Cricket website
 Ilkeston Rutland CC Youtube website
 Remembering Ilkeston Rutland's finest: Malc Wilson

English club cricket teams
Cricket in Derbyshire
1824 establishments in England
Club cricket